Sommet Olympia is a ski school and resort in Quebec, Canada. The resort is located not far from Montreal, in the Laurentians. According to ski express magazine, Mont Olympia is "the best" ski mountain for beginners. The resort has  of skiable terrain with 6 ski lifts and a vertical drop of 200 meters.

References

Sommet Olympia website
Technical Facts

Ski areas and resorts in Quebec